Group 9 consisted of three of the 32 teams entered into the European zone: Greece, Hungary, and Soviet Union. These three teams competed on a home-and-away basis for the half spot of the 8.5 spots assigned to UEFA in the final tournament. The European spot in the UEFA - CONMEBOL would be assigned to the group's winner.

Hungary would go on to win the World Cup spot in that qualifier.

Standings

Matches

Notes

External links 
Group 9 Detailed Results at RSSSF

9
1976–77 in Greek football
1977–78 in Greek football
1976–77 in Hungarian football
1977–78 in Hungarian football
1976 in Soviet football
1977 in Soviet football